John Early (born January 21, 1988) is an American comedian and actor. He has appeared on 30 Rock as Jenna Maroney's son and in the independent film Fort Tilden. He starred in Search Party, which aired on TBS and HBO Max from 2016 to 2022.

Early life
Early is from Nashville, Tennessee. His father was a Presbyterian minister; his mother, a minister at a church of the Disciples of Christ.  He attended the University School of Nashville. He graduated from New York University, where he majored in acting. When he was 11, he became a big fan of Australian actress Toni Collette and ran a fan website devoted to her.

Career
Early was featured on Lauren Lapkus' podcast (Episode #41, August 28, 2015), as well as Wet Hot American Summer: First Day of Camp, which was released on Netflix in the summer of 2015. He tours around the country with his stand-up/variety show "Literally Me" and also hosts a monthly variety event (called Showgasm) at Ars Nova in New York City. He has made voice appearances on two episodes of Bob's Burgers as brunch blogger Dalton Crespin.

Early frequently collaborates with comedians such as Hamm Samwich and Kate Berlant in a variety of sketch and filmed presentations. In 2016, he wrote and starred in his own 30-minute episode of the sketch show Netflix Presents: The Characters. In 2017, he starred alongside Berlant in the Vimeo miniseries 555, directed by Andrew DeYoung. He also had a small role as Evan in the 2017 drama Beatriz at Dinner, starring Salma Hayek and John Lithgow. In 2019, Early appeared in the music video for "Squidward Nose" by Cupcakke. In July 2019, Early starred in an episode of Drunk History about Martha Mitchell, which included acting by Vanessa Bayer and Tony Hale.

Early appeared in a small skit titled “Credit Card Roulette” in the Netflix comedy program I Think You Should Leave with Tim Robinson, and in the music video for "Anti-Hero" by Taylor Swift. In June 2022, Peacock released a sketch comedy special produced by Early and his comedy partner, Kate Berlant, titled "Would It Kill You To Laugh".

Personal life 
Early is gay. He has stated he is a member of the Democratic Socialists of America.

Filmography

Film

Television

Music videos

References

External links

1988 births
Living people
21st-century American comedians
21st-century American male actors
American gay actors
American LGBT comedians
American male comedians
American male film actors
American male television actors
American male voice actors
American sketch comedians
American stand-up comedians
California socialists
Gay comedians
LGBT people from Tennessee
Male actors from Nashville, Tennessee
Members of the Democratic Socialists of America